Board Up the House is the second full-length album by the experimental metal band Genghis Tron. The album was recorded and mixed at Godcity Studio from August 29 to September 21, 2007, in Salem, Massachusetts, by Converge guitarist Kurt Ballou. It was mastered at New Alliance East by Nick Zampiello. The album was released on February 19, 2008, by Relapse Records on CD and on March 25 by Lovepump United on vinyl.

There are two different vinyl releases from Lovepump United: standard and limited. The standard has two black vinyl discs with the second being single-sided. On the unused side is an etching similar to the album artwork. The limited edition is the same except the first disc is colored with a transparent splatter design, and is limited to 400 copies.

This is the last Genghis Tron album with vocalist Mookie Singerman. This would be the band's last studio album until the release of Dream Weapon in 2021.

Track listing

Personnel

Genghis Tron
Mookie Singerman – keyboard, vocals
Michael Sochynsky – drum programming, keyboard
Hamilton Jordan – drum programming, guitar

Additional musicians
Greg Puciato (The Dillinger Escape Plan) – guest vocals on "The Feast"
Kurt Ballou – toy drums on "Endless Teeth"

Production
Produced by Kurt Ballou and Genghis Tron
Engineered and mixed by Kurt Ballou
Mastered by Nick Zampiello

References

External links
Genghis Tron official website
Genghis Tron official MySpace page
Lovepump United record label
Relapse Records

2008 albums
Genghis Tron albums
Albums produced by Kurt Ballou